Glyphipterix sabella is a species of sedge moth in the genus Glyphipterix. It was described by Newman in 1856. It is found in Australia, including Victoria.

References

Moths described in 1856
Glyphipterigidae
Moths of Australia